Joseph Cecil Marco (born October 4, 1988) is a Filipino actor, model, singer and endorser who played the role of Santi Domingo in the GMA Network Philippine drama series La Vendetta and who is currently a Star Magic artist in the ABS-CBN, who appeared in Sabel, Honesto, Pasión de Amor and played Diego Torillo in Wildflower (TV series). Before this, he used to appear on several commercials like E-Aji Dip Snax, Downy and Head & Shoulders. On September 15, 2007, he was launched as part of the 15 new discoveries of GMA Artist Center, and was one of the first few who was quickly given a project via La Vendetta.

Biography
Joseph Cecil Marco, born on October 4, 1988, is of German, Italian and Spanish descent from his father's side. He is the fourth of eight children of his parents, having an elder sister who resides in California, two elder brothers, and four younger sisters. He is the nephew of DZMM anchor Tita Norma Marco.

Marco graduated high school in Faith Christian School in Cainta, Rizal in 2005 and did not finish college after he was discovered by his manager in Eastwood City. He said, "Nagulat nga po ako na first VTR ko, nakapasa agad ako." (I was surprised that I got approved on my first VTR.) during the initial presscon of La Vendetta.

Marco currently dates Russian Daria Romanova, previously dated Miss Philippines Earth 2019 Celeste Cortesi who now dates football player, model and 4Ps beneficiary Mathew Custodio.

Career

2007–2009
After his first commercial, he came up more TV commercials with products such as Coca-Cola, E-Aji Dip Snax and Downy.

Marco signed up with GMA Artist Center in September 2007. He was one of the first of his batch to have been given a TV project when he was added to the cast of the then airing TV drama series, La Vendetta. Here, he played the role of a geek teenager Santi Domingo. At the initial phase of their presentation as new artists, Marco was able to guest at different programmes on GMA such as Showbiz Central, SOP Rules and Nuts Entertainment.

In 2007, he was included in Philippines' Cosmopolitan magazine's 2007 69 Bachelors but did not join the fashion show held at The Fort. For the fantasy TV drama, Dyesebel, he played an assistant named 'Joseph'

2010–2014
In 2010, Marco transferred network to ABS-CBN. Marco was picked to be one of the lead cast in ABS-CBN's show Sabel as Raymond Sandoval, with Jessy Mendiola and AJ Perez. Marco also appeared in some episodes of the anthology, Maalaala Mo Kaya.

In 2014, he played the main role of Dave Martinez in the afternoon TV series entitled Pure Love, alongside Alex Gonzaga and Yen Santos.

2015–present
In March 2015, ASAP launched Joseph's newest boy group called "Harana" together with his co-members, Marlo Mortel, Bryan Santos and Michael Pangilinan with their carrier single, "Number One". He was one of the main cast of the primetime series Pasión de Amor, a Philippine remake of Pasión de Gavilanes, that aired in June 2015.

In 2016, Joseph joined the cast of "Dolce Amore". He played the role of River Cruz and became the new rival of Tenten to Serena's heart.

In 2017, he was cast as one of the leading men in the ABS-CBN teleserye, Wildflower. Joseph played the role of Diego Ardiente Torillo, whose parents caused the death of Ivy's – the female lead – parents. His character later challenged Ivy's plans, of which falling in love was not included.

In 2019, after taking a 10-month hiatus from teleseryes, he joined the cast of Los Bastardos, another ABS-CBN teleserye. Joseph played the lead role of Lorenzo Cardinal, one of the sons of Don Roman Cardinal.

In 2020, he portrayed the role of Avel Mansueto in Ang sa Iyo ay Akin.

Filmography

Discography
 Harana (2015)

Accolades

References

External links

1988 births
Living people
ABS-CBN personalities
Filipino male child actors
Filipino male film actors
Filipino Christians
Filipino evangelicals
Filipino male models
Filipino people of German descent
Filipino people of Italian descent
Filipino people of Spanish descent
GMA Network personalities
Male actors from Rizal
Star Magic